The United Kingdom of Great Britain and Ireland remained officially neutral throughout the American Civil War (1861–1865). It legally recognised the belligerent status of the Confederate States of America (CSA) but never recognised it as a nation and neither signed a treaty with it nor ever exchanged ambassadors. Over 90 percent of Confederate trade with Britain ended, causing a severe shortage of cotton by 1862. Private British blockade runners sent munitions and luxuries to Confederate ports in return for cotton and tobacco. In Manchester, the massive reduction of available American cotton caused an economic disaster referred to as the Lancashire Cotton Famine. Despite the high unemployment, some Manchester cotton workers refused out of principle to process any cotton from America, leading to direct praise from President Lincoln, whose statue in Manchester bears a plaque which quotes his appreciation for the textile workers in "helping abolish slavery". Top British officials debated offering to mediate in the first 18 months, which the Confederacy wanted but the United States strongly rejected.

Public opinion was divided over the war, with support for the Confederacy tending to emanate from the upper class while the middle and lower classes mostly favored the Union. Large-scale trade continued between Britain and the US. The US shipped grain to Britain, and Britain sold manufactured items and munitions to the US. Immigration continued into the US, with many Britons volunteering for the United States Army.  British trade with the Confederacy fell over 90% from the prewar period, with a small amount of cotton going to Britain and hundreds of thousands of munitions and luxury goods slipped in by numerous small blockade runners operated and funded by British private interests.

The Confederate strategy for securing independence was based largely on the hope of military intervention by Britain and France. A serious diplomatic dispute erupted over the "Trent Affair" in late 1861 but was resolved peacefully after five weeks.

British intervention was likely only in co-operation with France, which had an imperialistic venture underway in Mexico. By early 1863, intervention was no longer seriously considered, as Britain turned its attention elsewhere, especially toward Russia and Greece. In addition, at the outbreak of the American conflict, for both the United Kingdom and France the costly and controversial Crimean War (October 1853 to February 1856) was in the still-recent past, the United Kingdom had major commitments in British India in the wake of the Indian Rebellion of 1857, and France had major imperial ambitions outside of the Western Hemisphere, and was considering or had already commenced military ventures in Morocco, China, Vietnam, North Africa, and Italy.

A long-term issue was the sales of warships to the Confederacy. A British shipyard (John Laird and Sons) built two warships for the Confederacy, including the CSS Alabama, over vehement protests from the US. Known as the Alabama Claims, the controversy was resolved peacefully after the Civil War when the US was awarded $15.5 million in arbitration by an international tribunal for damages caused by the warships.

In the end, British involvement did not significantly affect the outcome of the war. The US diplomatic mission, headed by Minister Charles Francis Adams Sr., proved to be much more successful than the Confederate missions, which were never officially recognized by Britain.

Confederate policies

Confederate opinion, led by President Jefferson Davis, was dominated by "King Cotton," the idea that British dependence on cotton for its large textile industry would lead to diplomatic recognition and mediation or military intervention. The Confederates had not sent out agents ahead of time to ascertain if the King Cotton policy would be effective. Instead, it was by popular demand, not government action, that shipments of cotton to Europe were ended in spring 1861. When the Confederate diplomats arrived, they tried to convince British leaders that the US naval blockade was an illegal paper blockade. Historian Charles Hubbard writes:

Davis left foreign policy to others in government and, rather than developing an aggressive diplomatic effort, tended to expect events to accomplish diplomatic objectives. The new president was committed to the notion that cotton would secure recognition and legitimacy from the powers of Europe. The men Davis selected as secretary of state and emissaries to Europe were chosen for political and personal reasons – not for their diplomatic potential. This was due, in part, to the belief that cotton could accomplish the Confederate objectives with little help from Confederate diplomats.

Hubbard added that Davis's policy was stubborn and coercive. The King Cotton strategy was resisted by the Europeans. Secretary of War Judah Benjamin and Secretary of the Treasury Christopher Memminger warned that cotton should be immediately exported to build up foreign credits.

Union policies

The Union's main goal in foreign affairs was to maintain friendly relations and large-scale trade with the world and to prevent any official recognition of the Confederacy by any country, especially Britain. Other concerns included preventing the Confederacy from buying foreign-made warships; gaining European support for policies against slavery; and attracting immigrant laborers, farmers, and soldiers. There had been continuous improvement in Anglo-American relations throughout the 1850s. The issues of Oregon, Texas and the border between the United States and the British colonies had all been resolved, and trade was brisk. Secretary of State William H. Seward, the primary architect of American foreign policy during the war, intended to maintain the policy principles that had served the country well since the American Revolution: "non-intervention by the United States in the affairs of other countries and resistance to foreign intervention in the affairs of the United States and other countries in this hemisphere."

British policies
British public opinion was divided on the American Civil War. The Confederacy tended to have support from the elites: the aristocracy and the landed gentry, which identified with the Southern planter class, and Anglican clergy and some professionals who admired tradition, hierarchy and paternalism. The Union was favored by the middle classes, the religious Nonconformists, intellectuals, reformers and most factory workers, who saw slavery and forced labor as a threat to the status of the working man. However, historians have noted that most Britons did not express an opinion on the matter. As for the government, Chancellor of the Exchequer William Ewart Gladstone, whose family fortune had been based on slavery in the West Indies before 1833, supported the Confederacy. Foreign Minister Lord Russell wanted neutrality. Prime Minister Lord Palmerston wavered between support for national independence, his opposition to slavery and the strong economic advantages of Britain remaining neutral.

Even before the war started, Lord Palmerston pursued a policy of neutrality. His international concerns were centered in Europe, where he had to watch both Napoleon III's ambitions in Europe and Otto von Bismarck's rise in Prussia. There were also serious problems involving Italy, Poland, Russia, Denmark and China.  British reactions to American events were shaped by past British policies and their own national interests, both strategically and economically. In the Western Hemisphere, as relations with the United States improved, Britain had become cautious about confronting it over issues in Central America. As a naval power, Britain had a long record of insisting that neutral nations abide by its blockades, a perspective that led from the earliest days of the war to de facto support for the Union blockade and frustration in the South.

Diplomatic observers were suspicious of British motives. The Russian Minister in Washington, Eduard de Stoeckl, noted, "The Cabinet of London is watching attentively the internal dissensions of the Union and awaits the result with an impatience which it has difficulty in disguising." De Stoeckl advised his government that Britain would recognize the Confederacy at its earliest opportunity. Cassius Clay, the United States Minister in Russia, stated, "I saw at a glance where the feeling of England was. They hoped for our ruin! They are jealous of our power. They care neither for the South nor the North. They hate both."

Lincoln appointed Charles Francis Adams Sr., as minister to Britain. An important part of his mission was to make clear to the British that the war was a strictly-internal insurrection and afforded the Confederacy no rights under international law. Any movement by Britain to recognizing the Confederacy officially would be considered an unfriendly act toward the US. Seward's instructions to Adams included the suggestion that it should be made clear to Britain that a nation with widely scattered possessions, as well as a homeland that included Scotland and Ireland, should be very wary of "set[ting] a dangerous precedent."

Lord Lyons was appointed as the British minister to the United States in April 1859. An Oxford graduate, he had two decades of diplomatic experience before being given the American post. Lyons, like many British leaders, had reservations about Seward and shared them freely in his correspondence, which was widely circulated within the British government. As early as January 7, 1861, well before the Lincoln administration had even assumed office, Lyons wrote to British Foreign Secretary Lord Russell about Seward:

Despite his distrust of Seward, throughout 1861, Lyons maintained a "calm and measured" diplomacy that contributed to a peaceful resolution to the Trent crisis.

Slavery and trade with the Confederacy
The Confederate States came into existence after seven of the fifteen slave states seceded because of the election of Republican President Lincoln, whose party committed to the containment of slavery geographically and the weakening of slaveowners' political power. Slavery was the cornerstone of the South's plantation economy, although it was repugnant to the moral sensibilities of most people in Britain, which had abolished slavery in its Empire in 1833. Until the fall of 1862, the immediate end of slavery was not an issue in the war; in fact, some Union states (Kentucky, Maryland, Missouri, Delaware, and what became West Virginia) allowed slavery. In 1861, Missouri had sought to extradite an escaped slave from Canada to face trial for a murder committed in his flight for which some in Britain falsely believed the punishment was to be burned alive.

Lincoln's Emancipation Proclamation, announced in preliminary form in September 1862, made ending slavery an objective of the war and caused European intervention on the side of the South to be unpopular. However, some British leaders expected it would cause a large-scale race war that might need foreign intervention. Gladstone opened a cabinet debate over whether Britain should intervene, emphasizing the humanitarian intervention to stop the staggering death toll, risk of a race war, and failure of the Union to achieve decisive military results. Ultimately, the cabinet decided that the American situation was less urgent than the need to contain Russian expansion, so it rejected intervention.

During the Civil War, several British arms companies and financial firms secretly conducted business with Confederate agents in Europe, supplying the Confederacy with badly needed arms and military wares throughout the conflict, in exchange for Southern cotton. Companies like Trenholm, Fraser & Company also provided funding for British shipyards which built blockade runners used for running the Union blockade to import badly needed cotton which textile factories in Britain were heavily dependent on. British companies like Sinclair, Hamilton and Company,  S. Isaac, Campbell & Company,  London Armoury Company and others were the primary suppliers of arms and military supplies, frequently extending credit to Confederate agents for them to make such purchases. These actions extended the Civil War by two years and costed 400,000 more lives of Union and Confederate soldiers and civilians.

Trent Affair

Outright war was a possibility in late 1861, when the U.S. Navy took control of a British mail ship and seized two Confederate diplomats. Confederate President Jefferson Davis had named James M. Mason and John Slidell as commissioners to represent Confederate interests in England and France. They went to Havana, in Spanish Cuba, where they took passage for England on the British mail steamer . The American warship  under Captain Charles Wilkes was looking for them.

It was generally then agreed that a nation at war had the right to stop and search a neutral merchant ship if it suspected that ship of carrying the enemy's dispatches. Mason and Slidell, Wilkes reasoned, were in effect Confederate dispatches and so he had the right to remove them. On November 8, 1861, he fired twice across the bow of the Trent, sent a boat's crew aboard, seized the Confederate commissioners, and bore them off in triumph to the US, where they were held prisoner in Boston. Wilkes was hailed as a national hero.

The violation of British neutral rights triggered an uproar in Britain. Britain sent 11,000 troops to Canada, and the British fleet was put on a war footing with plans to blockade New York City if war broke out. In addition, the British put an embargo on the export of saltpetre which the US needed to make gunpowder.  Approximately 90% of the world's natural reserves of saltpetre were in British territory and the US had a purchasing commission in London buying up every ounce it could get. A sharp note was dispatched to Washington to demand the return of the prisoners as an apology. Lincoln, concerned about Britain entering the war, ignored anti-British sentiment, issued what the British interpreted as an apology without actually apologizing, and ordered the prisoners to be released.

War was unlikely in any event, as not only was the United States importing saltpetre from Britain it was also providing Britain with over 40% of its wheat imports during the war years, and suspension would have caused severe disruption to its food supply. Britain imported about 25–30% of its grain ("corn" in British English), and poor crops in 1861 and 1862 in France made Britain even more dependent on shiploads from New York City. Furthermore, British banks and financial institutions in the City of London had financed many projects such as railways in the US. There were fears that war would result in enormous financial losses as investments were lost and loans defaulted on.

Britain's shortage of cotton was partially made up by imports from India and Egypt by 1863. The Trent Affair led to the Lyons-Seward Treaty of 1862, an agreement to clamp down hard on the Atlantic slave trade by using the US Navy and the Royal Navy.

Possibility of recognizing Confederacy
The possibility of recognizing the Confederacy came to the fore late in the summer of 1862. At that time, as far as any European could see, the war seemed to be a stalemate. The US attempt to capture the Confederate capital had failed, and in the east and west alike, the Confederates were on the offensive. Charles Francis Adams Sr., warned Washington that the British government might very soon offer to mediate the difficulty between North and South, which would be a polite but effective way of intimating that in the opinion of Britain, the fight had gone on long enough and should be ended by giving the South what it wanted. Recognition, as Adams warned, risked all-out war with the United States. War would involve an invasion of Canada, a full-scale American attack on British shipping interests worldwide, an end to American grain shipments that were providing a large part of the British food supply, and an end to British sales of machinery and supplies to the US. The British leadership, however, thought that if the Union armies were decisively defeated, the US might soften its position and accept mediation.

Earl Russell, British Foreign Secretary, had given Mason no encouragement, but after news of the Second Battle of Bull Run reached London in early September, Palmerston agreed that in late September, there could be a cabinet meeting at which Palmerston and Russell would ask approval of the mediation proposal. Then, Russell and Palmerston decided not to bring the plan before the cabinet until they got further word about Lee's invasion of the North. If the Northerners were beaten, the proposal would go through; if Lee failed, it might be well to wait a little longer before taking any action.

The British working-class population, most notably the British cotton workers who suffered the Lancashire Cotton Famine, remained consistently opposed to the Confederacy. A resolution of support was passed by the inhabitants of Manchester and sent to Lincoln. His letter of reply has become famous:

There is now a statue of Lincoln in Manchester, with an extract from his letter carved on the plinth.

Lincoln became a hero amongst the British working class with progressive views. His portrait, often alongside that of Garibaldi, adorned many parlour walls. One can still be seen in the boyhood home of David Lloyd George, now part of the Lloyd George Museum.

The decisive factor, in the fall of 1862 and increasingly thereafter was the Battle of Antietam and what grew out of it. Lee's invasion was a failure at Antietam, and he barely escaped back to Virginia. It was now obvious that no final, conclusive Confederate triumph could be anticipated. The swift recession of the high Confederate tide was as visible in Britain as in America, and in the end, Palmerston and Russell dropped any notion of bringing a mediation-recognition program before the cabinet.

Emancipation Proclamation
During the late spring and early summer of 1862, Lincoln had come to see that he must broaden the base of the war. The Union itself was not enough; the undying vitality and drive of Northern anti-slavery men must be brought into full, vigorous support of the war effort and so the United States chose to declare itself officially against slavery. The Lincoln administration believed that slavery was the basis of the Confederate economy and leadership class and that victory required its destruction. Lincoln had drafted a plan and waited for a battlefield victory to announce it. The Battle of Antietam gave Lincoln victory, and on September 22, he gave the Confederacy 100 days notice to return to the Union or else on January 1, 1863, all slaves held in areas in rebellion would be free. William Ewart Gladstone, the Chancellor of the Exchequer and a senior Liberal leader, had accepted slavery in his youth; his family had grown wealthy through the ownership of slaves in the West Indies. However, the idea of slavery was abhorrent to him, and his idea was to civilise all nations. He strongly spoke out for Confederate independence. When the Emancipation Proclamation was announced, he tried to make the counterargument that an independent Confederacy would do a better job of freeing the slaves than an invading northern army would. He warned that a race war was imminent and would justify British intervention. Emancipation also alarmed the British Foreign Secretary Lord John Russell, who expected a bloody slave uprising. The question then would be British intervention on humanitarian grounds.  However, there was no slave uprising and no race war.  The advice of the war minister against going to war with United States, as well as the tide of British public opinion, convinced the cabinet to take no action.

Confederate diplomacy

Once the war with the US began, the best hope for the survival of the Confederacy was military intervention by Britain and France. The US realized that as well and made it clear that recognition of the Confederacy meant war and the end of food shipments into Britain. The Confederates who had believed in "King Cotton" (Britain had to support the Confederacy to obtain cotton for its industries) were proven wrong. Britain, in fact, had ample stores of cotton in 1861 and depended much more on grain from the US.

During its existence, the Confederate government sent repeated delegations to Europe; historians do not give them high marks for diplomatic skills. James M. Mason was sent to London as Confederate minister to Queen Victoria, and John Slidell was sent to Paris as minister to Napoleon III. Both were able to obtain private meetings with high British and French officials, but they failed to secure official recognition for the Confederacy. Britain and the US were at sword's point during the Trent Affair in late 1861. Mason and Slidell had been seized from a British ship by an American warship. Queen Victoria's husband, Prince Albert, helped calm the situation, and Lincoln released Mason and Slidell and so the episode was no help to the Confederacy.

Throughout the early years of the war, British foreign secretary Lord Russell, Napoleon III, and, to a lesser extent, British Prime Minister Lord Palmerston, explored the risks and advantages of recognition of the Confederacy or at least offering a mediation. Recognition meant certain war with the US, loss of American grain, loss of exports, loss of investments in American securities, potential invasion of Canada and other North American colonies, higher taxes, and a threat to the British merchant marine with little to gain in return. Many party leaders and the general public wanted no war with such high costs and meager benefits. Recognition was considered following the Second Battle of Manassas, when the British government was preparing to mediate in the conflict, but the Union victory at the Battle of Antietam and Lincoln's Emancipation Proclamation, combined with internal opposition, caused the government to back away.

In 1863, the Confederacy expelled all foreign consuls (all of them British or French diplomats) for advising their subjects to refuse to serve in combat against the US.

Throughout the war, all European powers adopted a policy of neutrality, meeting informally with Confederate diplomats but withholding diplomatic recognition. None ever sent an ambassador or official delegation to Richmond. However, they applied principles of international law and recognized both sides as belligerents. Canada allowed both Confederate and Union agents to work openly within its borders.

Postwar adjustments and Alabama claims
Northerners were outraged at British tolerance of non-neutral acts, especially the building of warships and blockade runners smuggling weapons to the South. The United States at first only demanded vast reparations for "direct damages" caused by British-built commerce raiders, especially CSS Alabama. Senator Charles Sumner of Massachusetts, the chairman of the U.S. Senate Foreign Relations Committee, also demanded that "indirect damages" be included, specifically the British blockade runners.

However, Palmerston bluntly refused to pay and the dispute continued for years after the war. After Palmerston's death, Prime Minister Gladstone agreed to include the US war claims in treaty discussions on other pending issues, such as fishing rights and border disputes. In 1872, pursuant to the resultant Treaty of Washington, an international arbitration board awarded $15,500,000 to the US only for "direct damages" caused by British-built Confederate ships, and the British apologized for the destruction but admitted no guilt.

Long-term impact
The Union victory emboldened the forces in Britain that demanded more democracy and public input into the political system. The resulting Reform Act 1867 enfranchised the urban male working class in England and Wales and weakened the upper-class landed gentry, who identified more with the Southern planters. Influential commentators included Walter Bagehot, Thomas Carlyle, John Stuart Mill, and Anthony Trollope. Additionally, many Irishmen saw service in both the Union and Confederate State Army.

Popular culture 
 Song: "Our Neutral Friend" on IMSLP

See also

 Journal of a Residence on a Georgian Plantation in 1838–1839
 United Kingdom–United States relations
France in the American Civil War
Canada in the American Civil War
Bahamas in the American Civil War
Blockade runners of the American Civil War
 Timeline of British diplomatic history
 International relations (1814–1919)
Foreign enlistment in the American Civil War

References

Bibliography

 Adams, Ephraim Douglass. Great Britain and the American Civil War (2 vol. 1925) online
 Baxter, James P. 3rd. "Papers Relating to Belligerent and Neutral Rights, 1861–1865". American Historical Review Vol 34 No 1 (Oct 1928) in JSTOR
 Baxter, James P. 3rd. "The British Government and Neutral Rights, 1861–1865." American Historical Review Vol 34 No 1 (Oct 1928) in JSTOR
 Beloff, Max. "Great Britain and the American Civil War." History 37.129 (1952): 40–48. online
 Berwanger, Eugene H. The British Foreign Service and the American Civil War. (1994), the diplomats and consuls
 Blackett, R. J. M. Divided Hearts: Britain and the American Civil War (2001) 273pp
 Bourne Kenneth. Britain and the Balance of Power in North America, 1815–1908. (1967)
 Bourne, Kenneth. "British Preparations for War with the North, 1861–1862,"  The English Historical Review Vol 76 No 301 (Oct 1961) pp 600–632 in JSTOR
 Brauer, Kinley J. "The Slavery Problem in the Diplomacy of the American Civil War," Pacific Historical Review, Vol. 46, No. 3 (Aug. 1977), pp. 439–469 in JSTOR
 Brauer, Kinley J. "British Mediation and the American Civil War: A Reconsideration," Journal of Southern History, Vol. 38, No. 1 (Feb. 1972), pp. 49–64 in JSTOR
  
 Campbell, Duncan Andrew, English Public Opinion and the American Civil War (2003)
 Cook Adrian. The Alabama Claims: American Politics and Anglo-American Relations, 1861-1872. (1975)
 Crook, David Paul. The North, the South, and the Powers, 1861–1865 (1974.)
 Crook, D. P. Diplomacy During the American Civil War. (1975).
 Doyle, Don. The Cause of All Nations: An International History of the American Civil War (2014)
 Duberman Martin B. Charles Francis Adams, 1807–1886 (1961)
 Edwards, Sam. "‘From here Lincoln came’: Anglo-Saxonism, the special relationship, and the anglicisation of Abraham Lincoln, c. 1860–1970." Journal of Transatlantic Studies 11.1 (2013): 22–46.
 Eichhorn, Niels. "The Intervention Crisis of 1862: A British Diplomatic Dilemma?" American Nineteenth Century History (2014) 15#3 pp 287–310. DOI: 10.1080/14664658.2014.959819.
 Ferris, Norman B. Desperate Diplomacy: William H. Seward's Foreign Policy, 1861. (1976) 265pp, scholarly study of 1861.
 Ferris, Norman B. The Trent Affair: A Diplomatic Crisis (1977) standard history
 Foreman, Amanda. A World on Fire: Britain's Crucial Role in the American Civil War (Random House, 2011),  958 pp.
 Fuller, Howard J., Clad in Iron: The American Civil War and the Challenge of British Naval Power (Praeger, 2007),  448 pp.
Geoffrey Wheatcroft, "How the British Nearly Supported the Confederacy," New York Times Sunday Book Review June 30, 2011 online
 Gentry, Judith Fenner. "A Confederate Success in Europe: The Erlanger Loan," Journal of Southern History, 36#2 (1970), pp. 157–188 in JSTOR
 George, David M. "John Baxter Langley: radicalism, espionage and the Confederate Navy in mid-Victorian Britain." Journal for Maritime Research 19.2 (2017): 121–142.
 Ginzberg, Eli. "The Economics of British Neutrality during the American Civil War," Agricultural History, Vol. 10, No. 4 (Oct. 1936), pp. 147–156 in JSTOR
 Graebner, Norman A., Northern Diplomacy and European Neutrality in Why the North Won the Civil War edited by David Herbert Donald. (1960)  (1996 Revision)
 
 Hubbard, Charles M. The Burden of Confederate Diplomacy (1998) 271pp
 Hyman, Harold Melvin. Heard Round the World; the Impact Abroad of the Civil War. (1969).
 Jenkins, Brian. Britain & the War for the Union. (2 vol 1974), by Canadian scholar
 Jones, Howard. Union in Peril: The Crisis over British Intervention in the Civil War (1992)
 Jones, Howard. Abraham Lincoln and a New Birth of Freedom: the Union and Slavery in the Diplomacy of the Civil War, (1999)
 Jones, Howard. ed. Blue and Gray Diplomacy: A History of Union and Confederate Foreign Relations (U. of North Carolina Press, 2010)online
 Jones, Wilbur Devereux. "The British Conservatives and the American Civil War," American Historical Review, (1953) 58#3 pp. 527–543 in JSTOR
 Kinser, Brent E. The American Civil War in the Shaping of British Democracy (Routledge, 2016).
 Lester, Richard I. Confederate Finance and Purchasing in Great Britain. (1975).
 
 Lorimer, Douglas A. "The Role of Anti-Slavery Sentiment in English Reactions to the American Civil War," Historical Journal, Vol. 19, No. 2 (Jun. 1976), pp. 405–420 in JSTOR
 Macdonald, Helen Grace. Canadian Public Opinion and the American Civil War (1926)
 Mahin, Dean B.  One war at a time: The international dimensions of the American Civil War (Brassey's, 1999)
 
 Merli, Frank, and Theodore A. Wilson. "The British Cabinet and the Confederacy." Maryland Historical Magazine 65.3 (1970): 239-62
 Merli, Frank J.  The Alabama, British Neutrality, and the American Civil War. (2004). 225 pp.
 Merli, Frank J.  Great Britain and the Confederate Navy, 1861–1865 (1971) 360pp
 Morton, W. L. The Critical Years: The Union of British North America, 1857–1873 (1964), on Canada
 Myers, Phillip. Caution and Cooperation: The American Civil War in British-American Relations. (Kent State UP, 2008).  340 pp  excerpt
 Nevins, Allan. "Britain, France and the War Issues." In Allan Nevins, The War for the Union: War Becomes Revolution, 1862–1863, (1960) pp. 242–274, excellent summary
 Owsley, Frank Lawrence. King Cotton Diplomacy: Foreign Relations of the Confederate States of America (1931)
 Milne, A. Taylor. "The Lyons-Seward Treaty of 1862," American Historical Review, Vol. 38, No. 3 (Apr. 1933), pp. 511–525 in JSTOR
 Palen, Marc-William. "The Civil War's Forgotten Transatlantic Tariff Debate and the Confederacy's Free Trade Diplomacy." Journal of the Civil War Wra 3.1 (2013): 35–61.
 Peraino, Kevin. "Lincoln vs. Palmerston" in his Lincoln in the World: The Making of a Statesman and the Dawn of American Power (2013) pp 120–69.
 Poast, Paul. "Lincoln's Gamble: Fear of Intervention and the Onset of the American Civil War." Security Studies 24.3 (2015): 502–527. online
 Reid, Brian Holden. "Power, Sovereignty, and the Great Republic: Anglo-American Diplomatic Relations in the Era of the Civil War"  Diplomacy & Statecraft (2003) 14#2 pp 45–76.
 Reid, Brian  Holden. "'A Signpost That Was Missed'? Reconsidering British Lessons from the American Civil War," Journal of Military History 70#2 (2006), pp. 385–414.
 Reid, Robert L.  "William E. Gladstone's 'Insincere Neutrality' During The Civil War." Civil War History (1969) 15#4 pp 293–307. 
 Ridley, Jasper. Lord Palmerston (1971) pp 548–62.
 Sebrell, Thomas E. Persuading John Bull: Union and Confederate Propaganda in Britain, 1860–65 (Lexington Books, 2014).
 Smith, Adam I.P.  "The 'Cult' of Abraham Lincoln and the Strange Survival of Liberal England in the Era of the World Wars," Twentieth Century British History (2010) 21#4 pp 486–509, how Lincoln became a hero to the British
 Stahr, Walter. Seward: Lincoln's Indispensable Man (2012), scholarly biography.
 Taylor, John M.  William Henry Seward: Lincoln's Right Hand (1991), 340pp; popular biography 
 Van Deusen, Glyndon G. William Henry Seward (1967), scholarly biography.
 Warren, Gordon H. Fountain of Discontent: The Trent Affair and Freedom of the Seas (1981), 317pp, based on extensive archival work
 Winks Robin W. Canada and the United States: The Civil War Years. (1971).

Foreign relations during the American Civil War
American Civil War by location
United Kingdom–United States relations
1860s in the United Kingdom